Sinicaepermenia taiwanella is a moth in the family Epermeniidae. It was described by John B. Heppner in 1990. It is found in Taiwan.

References

Epermeniidae
Moths described in 1990
Moths of Taiwan